Parliamentary elections were held in Sri Lanka on 15 February 1989, the first since 1977.  The elections that should normally have been held by 1983 had been cancelled by the 1982 referendum.

Results

By province

By electoral district

Notes

References

 
 
 
 

 
Parliamentary elections in Sri Lanka
Sri Lanka
1989 in Sri Lanka
Sri Lanka